Edward Trippas (born 22 September 1998) is an Australian athlete who competes in the 3000 metres steeplechase.

Early years 
Trippas was 8 years old when he started in Little Athletics at the insistence of his parents. He enjoyed the social aspect of the sport and started running steeplechase at the age of 15. Within two years he ran a time of 5:55 (2000m steeple) and 9:04 for the 3000m steeplechase. Both performances earned him national medals. In 2017 he made his international debut in the junior event at the World Cross Country Championships.

Achievements 
Trippas left Sydney and studied at Princeton University where he was coached by Jason Vigilante and ran in the NCAA championships. Trippas took a hiatus from his studies in order to try and concentrate achieving a place at the Olympics. His personal best time placied him third on the all time Australian list for the 3000 metres steeplechase.

In July  2021, Trippas was named in the Australian team to compete at the delayed 2020 Summer Games in Tokyo. He ran eleventh in his Men's 3000m steeplechase heat at the Tokyo 2020 Olympics in a time of 8:29.90, missing out on the final.

He is still studying at Princeton for his Economics degree and hopes to complete his studies by mid 2022.

References

1998 births
Living people
Australian male steeplechase runners
Australian male middle-distance runners
Princeton Tigers men's track and field athletes
Athletes (track and field) at the 2020 Summer Olympics
Olympic athletes of Australia